Jiang Wei (born 24 May 1971) is a Chinese wrestler. He competed in the men's Greco-Roman 48 kg at the 1992 Summer Olympics.

References

1971 births
Living people
Chinese male sport wrestlers
Olympic wrestlers of China
Wrestlers at the 1992 Summer Olympics
Place of birth missing (living people)